KRWI may refer to:

 Rocky Mount–Wilson Regional Airport (ICAO code KRWI)
 KRWI (FM), a radio station (98.1 FM) licensed to serve Wofford Heights, California, United States